Johannes Hintze (born 5 July 1999 in Brandenburg an der Havel) is a German swimmer. Hintze placed 18th in the 400 metre individual medley at the 2016 Summer Olympics in Rio de Janeiro, Brazil.

References

1999 births
Living people
German male swimmers
Sportspeople from Brandenburg an der Havel
Swimmers at the 2016 Summer Olympics
Olympic swimmers of Germany